Freddy Clavijo (born 3 May 1955) is a Uruguayan former footballer. He played in two matches for the Uruguay national football team in 1977. He was also part of Uruguay's squad for the 1979 Copa América tournament.

References

1955 births
Living people
Uruguayan footballers
Uruguay international footballers
Place of birth missing (living people)
Association football goalkeepers